Cecilia Mascolo is a Professor of Mobile Systems at the Department of Computer Science and Technology at the University of Cambridge, and a Fellow of Jesus College, Cambridge.

Education
Mascolo received her Bachelors, Masters and PhD in Computer Science from the University of Bologna, Italy.

Career and research
Mascolo serves as co-director of the centre for mobile, wearable systems and augmented intelligence. Her research spans mobile systems, mobile and sensor data analytics, sensor networks, machine learning for mobile and sensor systems and mobile health. She is the recipient of an Engineering and Physical Sciences Research Council (EPSRC) advanced fellowship (2005-2010) and a European Research Council (ERC) advanced grant (2019-2024). She has an h-index of over 60 according to Google Scholar. Her recent research on audio based mobile health diagnostics have led to the large scale crowdsourcing data collection for COVID-19 sounds.

Prior to joining Cambridge in 2008, she worked at University College London (UCL) and was an academic visitor at Washington University in St. Louis.

Awards and honours
 Mascolo ranks in the top 100 of Computer Scientists in the United Kingdom based on her h-index, data from DBLP and guide2research.com. She was listed by networking women as one of the 10 Women in Networking/Communications That You Should Know in 2016.

References 

Year of birth missing (living people)
Living people
Place of birth missing (living people)
University of Bologna alumni
Italian computer scientists
Italian women computer scientists
Italian expatriates in the United Kingdom
Members of the University of Cambridge Computer Laboratory
British computer scientists
British women computer scientists
Fellows of Jesus College, Cambridge